Ohannes Kurkdjian (first name sometimes spelled Onnes, Armenian spelling Hovhannes, 1851–1903) was a photographer based in Yerevan, Tiflis, Singapore and then Surabaya during the Dutch East Indies era.

His namesake business (located at Bultzingslowenplein) was the studio Kurkdjian Atelier and later O. Kurkdjian & Co.

Life and work
Kurkdjian was born in Kyurin, (Gürun), Ottoman Empire

He produced stereoscopic images of Ani. He worked for another photographer in Singapore for two months and moved to Surabaya, where he eventually established his own studio.

His namesake business (located at Bultzingslowenplein) was Kurkdjian Atelier and later O. Kurkdjian & Co. It grew to employ at least 30 people, one of whom was Thilly Weissenborn, the first significant Indonesian-born female photographer. The studio produced portraits including of Pakoe Boewono X Susuhunan van Solo as well as landscapes, business, building and trade photographs.

In 1897, Kurkdjian was joined by Englishman G. P. Lewis. Lewis took over the business after Kurkdjian's death in 1903 (in Surabaya, Indonesia). The studio was acquired by Mieling & Co., a pharmaceutical company, in 1915.

A famous photograph of Kurkdjian shows him standing behind his tripod-mounted camera photographing a volcano.

Gallery

References

External links
Collection of Kurkdjian photographs from "Come to Java" on Flickr
  Armenians in colonial Indonesia
 Photographs by Kurkdjian on YouTube

Armenian photographers
Russian photographers
Singaporean photographers
1851 births
1903 deaths
Photography in the Dutch East Indies